Mohammed Ali Ayad (born 16 May 1978) is a Qatari judoka.

He finished in joint fifth place in the half-heavyweight (100 kg) division at the 2006 Asian Games, having lost to Utkir Kurbanov of Uzbekistan in the bronze medal match.

External links
2006 Asian Games profile 

1978 births
Living people
Qatari male judoka
Place of birth missing (living people)
Judoka at the 2006 Asian Games
Asian Games competitors for Qatar